Brezen may refer to:

 Pretzel
Brezen, Kardzhali Province, Bulgaria
Brezen, Vitanje, a village in the Municipality of Vitanje, northeastern Slovenia